Spirit River was a provincial electoral district in Alberta, Canada mandated to return a single member to the Legislative Assembly of Alberta from 1940 to 1971.

History

Boundary history
Spirit River was created out of the northern half of the Grande Prairie district for the 1940 election. It contained the towns of Spirit River and Rycroft, and the Peace River formed its northern boundary. It saw no major boundary changes until it was replaced by Spirit River-Fairview, Grande Prairie and Smoky River in 1971.

Representation history

In the 1940 election, Spirit River was picked up by Social Credit candidate Henry DeBolt (for whom the community DeBolt was named). This is despite the fact that the incumbent Social Credit MLA for the area, William Sharpe, was defeated in what remained of the Grande Prairie district by an independent challenger. DeBolt served as MLA for twelve years, but lost the Social Credit nomination for the 1952 election to Adolph Fimrite. He attempted to defend his seat as an independent candidate, but finished last in a field of four candidates.

Fimrite, who won on the second count in 1952, defended the seat until it was abolished in 1971. The last election in this district saw a surge in support for the New Democrats, foreshadowing party leader Grant Notley's 1971 victory over Fimrite in Spirit River-Fairview, which absorbed most of Spirit River.

Election results

1940s

|-
!colspan=6|Second count

|-
|
|colspan=2|No second preference
|align=right|266

|}
Final count swing reflects increase in vote share from the first count.

|}

|}

1950s

|-
!colspan=6|Final count

|-
|
|colspan=2|No second/third preference
|align=right|912

|}

|}
In 1959, Alberta abandoned instant runoff voting in rural districts, instead electing MLAs by the first past the post method. This change is evident in the dramatic drop in spoiled (incorrectly marked) ballots.

|}

1960s

|}

|}

Plebiscite results

1957 liquor plebiscite

On October 30, 1957, a stand-alone plebiscite was held province wide in all 50 of the then current provincial electoral districts in Alberta. The government decided to consult Alberta voters to decide on liquor sales and mixed drinking after a divisive debate in the legislature. The plebiscite was intended to deal with the growing demand for reforming antiquated liquor control laws.

The plebiscite was conducted in two parts. Question A, asked in all districts, asked the voters if the sale of liquor should be expanded in Alberta, while Question B, asked in a handful of districts within the corporate limits of Calgary and Edmonton, asked if men and women should be allowed to drink together in establishments.

Province wide Question A of the plebiscite passed in 33 of the 50 districts, while Question B passed in all five districts. Spirit River voted in favour of the proposal, but the No side also polled a close vote. Voter turnout in the district was the lowest in the province, falling to half of the province wide average of 46%.

Official district returns were released to the public on December 31, 1957. The Social Credit government in power at the time did not consider the results binding. However, the results of the vote led the government to repeal all existing liquor legislation and introduce an entirely new Liquor Act.

Municipal districts lying inside electoral districts that voted against the plebiscite were designated Local Option Zones by the Alberta Liquor Control Board and considered effective dry zones. Business owners who wanted a license had to petition for a binding municipal plebiscite in order to be granted a license.

See also
 List of Alberta provincial electoral districts
 Spirit River, a river in northern Alberta, Canada
 Spirit River, a town in northern Alberta, Canada

References

Further reading

External links
Elections Alberta
The Legislative Assembly of Alberta

Former provincial electoral districts of Alberta